The 2002 Crystal Skate of Romania was the 4th edition of an annual senior-level international figure skating competition held in Romania. It was held between November 21 and 23, 2002 in Miercurea Ciuc. Skaters competed in the disciplines of men's singles and ladies' singles.

Results

Men

Ladies

External links
 results

Crystal Skate Of Romania, 2002